Siddharth Mahadevan is an Indian film composer who is known for his songs in the film Bhaag Milkha Bhaag in which he sang "Zinda" and the rock version of the title song "Bhaag Milkha Bhaag".

Career 
Mahadevan got further acclaim for the song Malang by music director Pritam in the movie Dhoom 3. He has also composed music for the Marathi films Swapna Tujhe ni Majhe, and Sugar Salt Ani Prem with his cousin Soumil Shringarpure. Additionally, he sang "Nachde Ne Sare" from the movie 'Baar Baar Dekho'.

On 12 October 2019, he performed for the Army officers at Fort William, Kolkata, West Bengal. GOC Eastern Command, Chief of Staff, Eastern Command and other officers and soldiers were present.

Personal life
He is the son of Shankar Mahadevan, a film music composer and playback singer from India.

Filmography

As composer

As playback singer

Other projects

 Siddharth Mahadevan composed a jingle for RADIO CITY'S kasakay Mumbai
 He also composed a jingle for DISCOVERY TLC's Chew
 He sang the title song for the webseries Life Sahi Hai

Awards

References

External links
 

Living people
Indian male playback singers
Telugu playback singers
Bollywood playback singers
Marathi playback singers
Malayalam playback singers
Indian rock singers
21st-century Indian singers
21st-century Indian male singers
Year of birth missing (living people)